Channallabes is a genus of airbreathing catfishes found in Africa.

Species
Six  species in this genus are recognized:
 Channallabes alvarezi (Román, 1970)
 Channallabes apus (Günther, 1873) (eel catfish)
 Channallabes longicaudatus (Pappenheim, 1911) 
 Channallabes ogooensis Devaere, Adriaens & Verraes, 2007
 Channallabes sanghaensis Devaere, Adriaens & Verraes]], 2007
 Channallabes teugelsi Devaere, Adriaens & Verraes, 2007

References
 

 

Catfish genera
Freshwater fish genera
Taxa named by Albert Günther